Stilpnolepis is a genus of Asian plants in the chamomile tribe within the daisy family.

Species
The only known species is Stilpnolepis centiflora, native to Mongolia and to China (Gansu, Nei Mongol, Ningxia, Shaanxi).

formerly included
see Elachanthemum 
Stilpnolepis intricata - Elachanthemum intricatum

References

Monotypic Asteraceae genera
Flora of Asia
Anthemideae